JNR may refer to:
 Japanese National Railways
 Journal of Nanoparticle Research
 Joyful Noise Recordings
 Junior (disambiguation)